Sandeggtind Peak is a  tall peak, standing  south of Sandho Heights on Sandegga Ridge in the Conrad Mountains, Queen Maud Land. It was discovered and photographed by the Third German Antarctic Expedition (1938–1939), led by Capt. Alfred Ritscher. It was mapped by Norway from air photos and surveys by NorAE, 1956–60, and named Sandeggtind (sand ridge peak).

See also
 List of mountains of Queen Maud Land

References

Mountains of Queen Maud Land
Orvin Mountains